Foelsche is a partly buried impact structure (or astrobleme), the eroded remnant of a former impact crater. It is situated about 85 km southeast of Borroloola in the Northern Territory, Australia, and named after the nearby Foelsche River. Although little of it is exposed at the surface, and no crater shaped topography is evident, the circular nature of the feature is obvious on aeromagnetic images, a factor that led to its discovery.

Description 
The impact occurred into flat-lying Mesoproterozoic sedimentary rocks of the McArthur Basin and most of the crater is covered by a semi-circular hill of flat-lying Neoproterozoic sedimentary rock. The only exposure of the crater itself are scattered outcrops of deformed sandstone and breccia around the northern edge of the overlying hill, which are inferred to be remnants of the crater rim. The rim is about 6 km in diameter. Evidence indicating an impact origin for the feature includes an abundance of shocked quartz grains in the sedimentary rocks overlying the crater; these are assumed to have been eroded from the floor of the crater. The prominent circular aeromagnetic anomaly which marks the hidden crater is believed to have been caused by the disruption of a horizontal layer of magnetic rock (igneous sill) by the impact event,.

The age of Foelsche is not well constrained, but it must be younger than the Mesoproterozoic target rocks and older than the Neoproterozoic rocks that partly fill the crater; it has been argued that the age is most likely Neoproterozoic because it appears that the crater was covered by sediments soon after the impact event.

See also

List of impact craters in Australia

References

Further reading 
 McMahon, K. H., Australian geophysical Pty Ltd report for AP2233 "Calvert Hills". Northern Territory Department of Mines and Energy, Open File company report, 70/5, Darwin, Australia, pp. 130. 1970

Impact craters of the Northern Territory
Proterozoic impact craters
Precambrian Australia
Geology of the Northern Territory